Miracle Faiʻilagi (born 31 August 1999) is a Samoan rugby union player who plays for  in Super Rugby. His playing position is lock or flanker. He was named in the Moana Pasifika squad for the 2023 Super Rugby Pacific season.

Faiʻilagi was born in Samoa and played his junior rugby and club rugby on the island for Vailele Rugby Club. He represented Samoa A in the 2020 World Rugby Pacific Challenge. Since 2021 he has represented Samoa Sevens, although missed out on selection for the 2022 Commonwealth Games. In 2022, he attended a World Rugby talent combine, where he was scouted by Moana Pasifika and signed to their 2023 squad.

References

External links
itsrugby.co.uk profile

1999 births
Samoan rugby union players
Samoa international rugby sevens players
Living people
Rugby union locks
Rugby union flankers
Moana Pasifika players